Zuffenhausen Giants is an Australian rules football club based in the Zuffenhausen neighborhood of Stuttgart that currently competes in the Australian Football League of Germany. As of the 2022 season the club plays its home matches at the Wilhelm-Braun-Sportpark in Stuttgart-Feuerbach.

History
Zuffenhausen Giants formed in 2017 by the merger of two AFLG clubs from Baden-Württemberg, the Stuttgart Emus and Freiburg Taipans. The club began playing in the AFLG in 2018. Since 2019 the club has been a department of the larger SSV Zuffenhausen sports club.

Grounds
The club's trainings grounds are the Sports Grounds SSV Zuffenhausen and District Sports Facility Schlotwiese. Home matches were previously played at the Eberhard-Bauer-Stadion in nearby Esslingen but are now held at the Wilhelm-Braun-Sportpark in Stuttgart-Feuerbach.

References

External links
Official Website
Official Facebook
AFLG profile

See also
Stuttgart Emus

Australian rules football clubs in Europe
2017 establishments in Germany
Australian rules football clubs in Germany